The Cathedral of St. John the Evangelist is the Anglican cathedral of the Diocese of Western Newfoundland. It is in the city of Corner Brook.

References
 

Cathedral of St John the Evangelist
Anglican church buildings in Newfoundland and Labrador